Neoperla darlingi is a species of insect in the family Perlidae. It is endemic to Borneo and is only known from an adult male specimen collected at Gunung Palung National Park. It has a yellow brown colour and a uniformly pale brown head; its wings are composed of a transparent membrane with brown venation and no distinctive markings. It was named after D.C. Darling, a curator of the Royal Ontario Museum who collected the holotype of this species.

References

Perlidae
Invertebrates of Borneo
Insects described in 2007
Insects of Indonesia